Michel Barrette (born April 26, 1957 in Chicoutimi, Quebec) is a television and movie actor, television and radio host and stand-up comedian. He has played various roles in Quebec movies and television shows since 1982.

Profile
After serving in the Canadian Armed Forces, Barrette started his movie acting career in 1982 and appeared in nearly a dozen movies, including Les Boys in the first part of the series in 1997 (as Roger, a defenceman for a garage league team), Aurore, and The Rocket (Maurice Richard), a tribute to life of the former Montreal Canadiens superstar Maurice "Rocket" Richard. He also appeared in several popular television series, including La Petite Vie in 1995, Scoop and Paparazzi. His most important role in television and arguably in his entire acting career was in KM/H, a TVA TV series in which he played the main character for nearly eight years. His second main role was as a detective in the series Un homme mort in 2006.

Barrette has also been one of the most notable stand-up comedians in Quebec since 1983 and performed several one-man comedy shows province-wide, including  in 1989, 100% Barrette in 1997,  in 2000,  in 2004 and Michel Barrette, 100% neuf in 2006.  He was also part of a major show to aid victims of the 1996 Saguenay Flood. He was a regular guest on Normand Brathwaite's defunct-satirical television show Piment Fort during the 1990s. His first famous role was his stand-up character named Roland "Hi-Ha" Tremblay, which became a hit around 1988, and was the basis for Serge Gaboury's comic strip of the same name, and also started the career of comic/actor Vincent Bolduc, who became famous by playing the same routine at age 9 or 10.

He previously hosted, with Jean-Marc Parent, Casse-Tête, a Télé-Metropole show for the 1987 and 1988 seasons while he also hosted the TVA show Planete en folie in 1998.

He hosted several radio shows, including morning shows on Montreal radio stations CKOI, CKMF and more recently CHMP-FM.

In 2005, he traded one snowmobile to Kyle MacDonald of the book One Red Paperclip for a "party in a keg" invention (a beer keg and a neon sign). The trade was a part of multiple consecutive bartering deals that allowed MacDonald to trade in a red paperclip for a house.

In 2022, Barrette played in Martin Villeneuve's The 12 Tasks of Imelda (Les 12 travaux d'Imelda), co-starring playwright Robert Lepage and actress-signer Ginette Reno, in which he plays Martin and Denis Villeneuve's uncle André.

Filmography

Cinema

 The Emperor of Peru - 1982
 Angel Square - 1990
 Montreal Stories (Montréal vu par...) - 1991
 Coyote - 1992
 The Postmistress - 1992
 Les Boys - 1997
 Alice's Odyssey (L'odyssée d'Alice Tremblay) - 2002
 Father and Sons (Père et fils) - 2003
 Bittersweet Memories (Ma vie en cinémascope) - 2004
 How to Conquer America in One Night (Comment conquérir l'Amérique en une nuit) - 2004
 The Rocket (Maurice Richard) - 2005
 Je me souviens - 2009
 Le poil de la bête - 2010
 Crying Out (À l'origine d'un cri) - 2010
 The Happiness of Others (Le Bonheur des autres) - 2011
 The 12 Tasks of Imelda (Les 12 travaux d'Imelda) - 2022
 Two Days Before Christmas (23 décembre) - 2022

Television

 Bye Bye (1990, 1996)
 La Petite Vie (1995)
 Scoop (1992–1995)
 10-07: L'affaire Zeus (1995)
 10-07: L'affaire Kalka (1996)
 Paparazzi (1997)
 KM/H (1998–2006)
 Un homme mort (2006)
 Le Gentleman (2009)
 Rock et Rolland (2010)

References

External links
 
 Michel Barrette Producer profile on The 1 Second Film website

1957 births
Living people
Canadian male film actors
Canadian stand-up comedians
Canadian male television actors
French Quebecers
Male actors from Quebec
People from Saguenay, Quebec
Comedians from Quebec